Tephritis afra is a species of tephritid or fruit flies in the genus Tephritis of the family Tephritidae.

Distribution
Tanzania.

References

Tephritinae
Insects described in 1941
Diptera of Africa